Uyghur cuisine is the cuisine of the Uyghur people, which are mainly situated in the autonomous region of Xinjiang, also commonly referred to as Uyghuristan or East Turkistan.

The cuisine is characterized by ingredients like roasted mutton and beef, as well as kebab and rice dishes. Traditionally, specific dishes like polo are eaten with one's bare hands instead of with utensils like spoons, forks or chopsticks. Signature dishes include polo, läghmän, and nan. Because the majority of Uyghur people are Muslim, the food is predominantly halal.

History
Around the 4th century, the majority of Uyghurs led a nomadic lifestyle and therefore relied on livestock for food. Aside from their meat, dairy products made from their milk became a staple for many families. Especially horse milk was widely used and consumed as horses were also held for transportation purposes. Many of the practices of this nomadic diet can still be observed in the descendants of Uyghurs who immigrated from the Mongolian Plateau to the Gansu Province.

After the Uyghurs accepted Islam as their state religion in the 1060s, many adopted a halal diet. By this time, they had shifted to an agricultural lifestyle. The area around Hotan was regarded as especially fertile and yielded a large variety of fruits, which led to the gradual settlement of people throughout the region. With this change, the food sources were diversified and flour-based dishes, mutton, and vegetables became integral to the cuisine. The Compendium of the Languages of the Turks from 1074, for example, lists a total of 14 types of bread made from wheat flour and we know from its descriptions that noodles, rice, millet, chöchüre (a kind of dumpling soup), and sausages made from grains and meat were also commonly eaten. Many traditional Uyghur cooking methods also date back to around this time of the Karakhan Empire.

Since the Tarim Basin was located along the Silk Road, Uyghur cuisine has been influenced by various Chinese foods, seasonings, and cooking methods, such as stir-frying, which were introduced from the east after the Tang Dynasty. In recent years, Russian cuisine has spread to Uyghurs from countries like the Kyrgyz Republic, which was once part of the Soviet Union. In addition, some people around Turfan have started practicing Buddhism, making vegetarian dishes more prevalent in this region.

Characteristics
Uyghur cuisine is centered around bringing out the natural flavors of the individual ingredients used in a dish. Meals usually consist of a mix of meat and seasonal vegetables, served alongside rice, handmade noodles, or nan. While mutton and beef are the most commonly used meats, chicken and goose are also served often, and sometimes even pigeon is eaten. Onions, carrots, potatoes, tomatoes, peppers, Chinese cabbage, and eggplant are frequently utilized in cooking as they are native to the Xinjiang area and therefore readily available most of the year.

Typical spices include salt, black pepper, cumin seeds, and red pepper flakes. Red pepper flakes are used to make laza, a chili sauce made with garlic and hot oil and commonly served with läghmän or benschä, Uyghur-style dumplings. Animal fats and butter are also used for flavoring dishes.

Unlike many Asian ethnic groups, Uyghur people are typically not lactose intolerant and diary products such as kumis (horse milk), ayran, and yoghurt are therefore consumed frequently.

As the majority of Uyghur people are Muslim, their food shares similarities to that of other Muslim peoples in Asia, such as Uzbeks, Kazakhs, and Turkish people. Similarly, many Uyghur dishes can also be found among other ethnic groups in Central Asia.

Food traditions
A traditional Uyghur-style breakfast might consist of nan and milk tea, which might be topped with jams or honey and eaten with raisins, walnuts, and other nuts.

Guest are greeted with tea, nan, pastries, and fruits before the main dishes are ready.

Main dishes
A common Uyghur dish is läghmän, boiled hand-pulled noodles made with wheat flour and eaten with säy, a stir-fried topping usually made with mutton, onions, peppers, tomatoes, and other seasonal vegetables. The dish was most likely derived from the Chinese lamian and adapted to create a distinctively Uyghur flavor. Naren chöp is a different noodle dish that is topped with a thin sauce of lamb, onions, and carrot and seasoned with a large amount of black or white pepper.

Another typical Uyghur dish is polo, a variation of pilaf, a dish that can be found throughout Central Asia. It is made by frying mutton or chicken, onions, and thinly sliced carrots in oil before adding rice and water and steaming it. Raisins and dried apricots may also be added. While it is traditionally made in a cast-iron pan, nowadays it's often transferred to a rice cooker for steaming. To balance out the oiliness of the polo, it is commonly served with salad or cold vermicelli noodles with raw vegetables (pintoza ham säy). A simple dish of steamed white rice with stir-fried vegetables is called gangpen.

There are also many varieties of soups, the most popular ones being shorpa, a lamb soup, and suykash, a type of soup made with noodles, meat, and vegetables such as potatoes and turnips. A special kind of suykash is tashlap suykash (which contains handmade noodles that are pulled and then ripped into small, thumb-size pieces and thrown into the boiling soup. There are also stews like yapma, which is made with lamb or beef, onions, potatoes, carrots, and tomatoes.

Like in many East and Southeast Asian countries, congee is also eaten by the Uyghur people, which is called shoyla in Uyghur. Aside from congee, there is also umaq, corn porridge made with corn flour, onion, turnips, and tomatoes and seasoned with salt.

A dish that has been adapted from Chinese and Russian cuisine is manta ((), a steamed dumpling filled with meat and Chinese cabbage or spinach. There are many varieties of this dish: pitir-manta, which features a thinner wrapper and may also contain zucchini or pumpkin; boluq manta, which uses a significantly thicker, yeasted dough; benschä, a smaller version that is boiled in water instead of steamed; and chöchüre, which are shaped like tortellini and are served in a tomato-based soup broth.

Breads
Nan is one of the oldest components of Uyghur cuisine and an integral part of the diet. While it is often mistaken as a specific type of bread, it is merely a generic term. The most common style of nan is hemek nan, a baked flatbread with a thicker crust made with wheat flour, salt, water, and vegetable oil and optionally topped with sesame or black cumin seeds. Another popular type of bread is girde, which is a thick, bagel-shaped bread with a hard and crispy crust that resembles bialy. toqatch nan, which is baked in a deep clay oven called tunur, is also a staple in many households.

There are also steamed breads such as yutaza, which is a multi-layered type of bread made with animal fat. A style of yeasted fried bread called peushkel is typically eaten with soups and stews. A multi-layered, thin, pan-fried bread called qatlima is usually prepared using leftover dough from other dishes.

Aside from nan, there are also many types of filled bread such as samsa, which are hand-held lamb pies roasted in a tunur. A flat, pan-grilled variety with a similar filling is called göshnan. Aside from lamb, baked pamirdin pies also stuffed with onions and carrots. Sambusa are fried Uyghur empanada filled with meat, rice, and carrots.

Meat dishes

Meat is a main ingredient in many Uyghur dishes. The most well-known meat dish are kawaplar, which are kebabs made from lamb or beef and seasoned with salt, black pepper, chili powder, and cumin and directly eaten off the skewer. While usually made on a grill and sold in food stalls on the road, there are also tunur kawap, which are made in a tunur clay oven.

A dish that gained popularity in the mid to late 1990s is dapanji or chong texse toxu qorumis, a Chinese-Uyghur fusion dish. A spicy, hot chicken stew is served on a big plate and after the chicken has been eaten, flat, hand-pulled noodles are added to the remaining sauce. The dish was invented in Shawan, Northern Xinjiang by a migrant from Sichuan who mixed hot chili peppers with chicken and potatoes in an attempt to reproduce a Sichuan taste.

Desserts
The most common flavors in Uyghur desserts are honey, nuts, raisins, and sultanas. Bakkali, a light and moist nut cake made with honey and walnuts, is a popular traditional dessert. Aside from walnuts, other types of nuts or raisins may be used as well. Soft cookies called pichene, which are made with plain, sweet dough, cut into shapes, and brushed with egg yolks, are commonly eaten with tea.

There is also a large scope of fried desserts. Burgu kuymak or maxar are twisted doughnuts, which are widely sold by street vendors. They are often made from two separate doughs: one sweetened with honey and the other with sugar. The honey dough takes on a deeper color while frying, giving the doughnuts a dual-colored appearance. Another street snack is matang, a thick and chewy bar consisting of various nuts held together by a sugar syrup that is usually sold by the slice.

A holiday specialty is sangza, a snack made by pulling a dough made of wheat flour into thin ropes and deep frying them. The crispy ropes are then twisted around each other and piled high on top of each other.

Halva is a sweet porridge made with corn flour and cooked with chopped onions, turnips, and tomatoes. It is also often eaten during sickness as the sweet stickiness of the porridge coats the throat and helps against soreness.

A sweet version of manta called sheker manta is often given as a treat to children. They are stuffed with walnuts and honey or brown sugar, the latter of which melts during steaming, soaking the inside of the dumpling in a thick, sweet syrup.

Fruits are also an important component of the Uyghur diet and are eaten as snacks with or in-between meals. Commonly eaten fruits include grapes, apples, watermelons, apricots, and figs.

Beverages

Beverages include  Uyhgur black tea, Milk tea. Another common beverage is the locally produced Xinjiang ( new territory ) Uyghuristan black beer, known to be stronger in flavor than other local Chinese beers. It is shipped throughout China.

Grapes are grown in the Xinjiang region, which are used for wine production and other grape products. In Turfan, wine is an important part of the local economy and was known in the Tang dynasty. The wine, called museles, is commonly made and used by the locals and is also produced commercially for export outside the region.

Outside of Xinjiang
Uyghur restaurants can be found in most mid-sized to large cities across China and is a popular ethnic cuisine there. Uyghur shops often sell nan at the counter, which is often bought by Han Chinese people for breakfast. Another popular dish are kawaplar, which are widely available at food stalls in many places. Uyghur restaurants in China are usually qingzhen certified, which is another term for halal.

Through franchising, Uyghur cuisine has also found its way outside of China. In April 2015, the restaurant chain Herembağ opened it's first store in San Francisco in the United States and later expanded with ten more locations within North America. Other popular franchises that servce Uyghur food include Yershari, Loulan, Tarhar, and Ali Jiang.

In Japan, Uyghur cuisine is available at specialty restaurants in Sakura-ku, Saitama, Saitama Prefecture, and Shinjuku, Tokyo. In its September 2010 issue, the outdoor magazine BE-PAL described läghmän as using pork instead of mutton and subsequently had to issue an apology for their mistake in November 2010.

See also
Chinese Islamic cuisine
Central Asian cuisine

References

External links
Uyghur Food
Herembağ Franchise

Central Asian cuisine
Cuisine